Monilesaurus ellioti, also known commonly as Elliot's forest lizard, is a species of arboreal, diurnal, lizard in the family Agamidae. The species is endemic to the Western Ghats, India.

Etymology
The specific name, ellioti, is in honor of Scottish naturalist Walter Elliot.

Geographic range
Endemic to the Western Ghats of India, M. ellioti is found in Anaimalai, Agasthyamalai, Cardamom Hills, Palni Hills, Nilgiris, Waynad, Coorg and Kudremukh.

Habitat

Description

The upper head-scales of M. ellioti are feebly keeled, imbricate, and much enlarged on the supraorbital region. There is a small spine behind the supraciliary edge, and two others on each side, the anterior midway between the nuchal crest and the tympanum, the posterior just above the latter, which measures nearly half the diameter of the orbit. The gular sac is not developed. The gular scales are strongly keeled, smaller than the ventrals. There is a strong oblique fold or pit in front of the shoulder, and a transverse gular fold. The nuchal crest is composed of a few widely separated slender spines, the longest of which measures about two thirds the diameter of the orbit. The dorsal crest is a mere denticulation. There are 53 to 61 scales round the middle of the body. The loreal scales are of nearly the same size as the ventrals, keeled, the uppermost with the points directed straight backwards, the others directed downwards and backwards. The ventral scales are strongly keeled. The adpressed hind limb reaches the anterior border of the orbit or the tip of the snout. The fourth finger is longer than the third. The tail is scarcely compressed. M. ellioti is olive above, with more or less distinct angular dark-brown cross bands on the body. There is an angular black mark on each side of the neck, and a white spot below the orbit. Dark lines radiate from the eye.

Reproduction
M. ellioti is oviparous.

References

Further reading
Boulenger GA (1885). Catalogue of the Lizards in the British Museum (Natural History). Second Edition. Volume I. ... Agamidæ.  London: Trustees of the British Museum (Natural History). (Taylor and Francis, printers). xii + 436 pp. + Plates I–XXXII. ("Calotes elliotti [sic]", pp. 330–331 + Plate XXV, figure 3).
Das I (2002). A Photographic Guide to Snakes and other Reptiles of India. Sanibel Island, Florida: Ralph Curtis Books. 144 pp. . (Calotes ellioti, p. 71).
Günther A (1864).  The Reptiles of British India.  London: The Ray Society. (Taylor and Francis, printers). xxvii + 452 pp. + Plates I–XXVI. ("C. elliotti [sic]", new species, p. 142).
Smith MA (1935). The Fauna of British India, Including Ceylon and Burma. Reptilia and Amphibia. Vol. II.—Sauria. London: Secretary of State for India in Council. (Taylor and Francis, printers). xiii + 440 pp. + Plate I + 2 maps. ("Calotes elliotti [sic]", pp. 207–208).

External links

http://novataxa.blogspot.com/2018/09/monilesaurus.html

Monilesaurus
Reptiles of India
Endemic fauna of the Western Ghats
Reptiles described in 1864
Taxa named by Albert Günther